Montmajour may refer to:-
Montmajour Abbey, in the Bouches du Rhône, France.
, a tanker in service with the Compagnie d'Armement Maritime, Djibouti from 1958 to 1963.